Backward or Backwards is a relative direction.

Backwards or Sdrawkcab (the word "backwards" with its letters reversed) may also refer to:
 Anadrome, a term created from another word spelled backwards
 "Backwards" (Red Dwarf), episode of sci-fi TV sitcom Red Dwarf
 Backwards (novel), a novel based on the episode
 Backwards: The Riddle of Dyslexia, 1984 American TV program
 "Backwards" (Rascal Flatts song), a 2006 country music song on Me and My Gang
 "Backwards", a song by Apartment 26 from the Mission: Impossible 2 (soundtrack)
 "Backward", a song by Quicksand from the album Manic Compression
 Backmasking, a recording technique in which a sound or message is recorded backward onto a track that is meant to be played forward
 "Sdrawkcab", a 1998 episode of Dexter's Laboratory

See also
Other Backward Class, a collective term used by the Government of India to classify castes which are educationally or socially disadvantaged